Paul Allen Walker (September 29, 1946 – November 16, 1991) was an American social psychologist and founding president of HBIGDA, the Harry Benjamin International Gender Dysphoria Association now known as WPATH, the World Professional Association for Transgender Health in 1979. He also served as director of the Janus Information Facility.

Walker graduated with a doctorate in social psychology from the University of Rochester in 1976. He performed research with John Money via the Office of Psychohormonal Research at Johns Hopkins University School of Medicine.

Walker began a sex offender treatment program at the University of Texas Medical Branch in Galveston, Texas, in 1976. He also ran the Gender Clinic.

Walker started his private practice in the early 1980s, moved his office to 1952 Union Street, San Francisco, California, treating transgender patients, including those with gender dysphoria, who identify with a gender different than their birth gender. Walker later came out as openly gay, and he lived on Castro Street, the most popular district in San Francisco for the gay community, as he continued his practice to specially help patients to seek sex reassignment surgery (SRS) almost until his death.  Walker typically diagnosed his patients with "anxiety" to keep their identities private and confidential between the doctor and patient until beginning the real life test, now called socially transitioning. Before SRS, a year of living in the gender role that is congruent with the true gender identity is required.

Walker died in November 1991 complications from HIV/AIDS.

References

External links
WPATH Board of Directors archive

Transgender and medicine
1946 births
1991 deaths
American social psychologists
University of Rochester alumni
American LGBT scientists
Transgender studies academics
AIDS-related deaths in the United States
20th-century LGBT people
LGBT psychologists